The Mokai Power Station is a geothermal power station owned by the Tuaropaki Power Company and operated by Mercury NZ Limited.  It is located approximately 30 km north west of Taupo in New Zealand.  The station uses a binary cycle manufactured by Ormat Industries.

The Tuaropaki Power Company is 75% owned by the Tuaropaki Trust and 25% by Mighty River Power.

The plant was initially constructed in 1999 as a 55 MW geothermal power station.  An additional 40 MW was added in 2005 and in 2007 plant capacity was increased to 110 MW.

See also

Geothermal power in New Zealand
List of power stations in New Zealand

References 

Geothermal power stations in New Zealand
Taupō District
Buildings and structures in the Taupo District